Golden Ears may refer to:

 Golden ear, a term for a person with an above-standard sense of hearing
 Golden Ears (mountain) a mountain in British Columbia
 Golden Ears Provincial Park, a provincial park in British Columbia, Canada
 Golden Ears Bridge, a bridge in British Columbia